Kirstene Janette Hair (born 12 August 1989) is a former Scottish Conservative Party politician. She was the Member of Parliament (MP) for Angus between 2017 and 2019.

Early life and career 
Hair was born on 12 August 1989 in Brechin, Angus, Scotland. She grew up in a large farming family based in Mains of Ardovie Farm. Hair has one younger brother and two older sisters. She was educated at Brechin High School where she was the head girl. Hair went on to study politics at the University of Aberdeen.

After graduation, Hair worked as an events manager and executive personal assistant at the Scottish publishing company DC Thomson. She stood as a Scottish Conservative Party candidate for Angus South at the 2016 Scottish Parliament election, and was defeated by incumbent Scottish National Party (SNP) MSP Graeme Dey.

Parliamentary career
Hair was elected to the House of Commons in 2017, overturning a majority of 11,230 to unseat the Scottish National Party (SNP) chief whip, Mike Weir. The constituency had been represented by an SNP MP since its creation in 1997.

In the UK Parliament, she was a member of the Scottish Affairs Select Committee, Home Affairs Select Committee, and Women and Equalities Committee. She had been a member of the Regulatory Reform Committee since November 2017.

Hair did not vote in the 2016 UK EU Membership referendum. In September 2017, she commented that she chose not to vote at the time as she could not decide on whether to support the UK leaving or remaining within the EU as she felt that there were strong arguments on both sides. She voted for then-Prime Minister Theresa May's Brexit withdrawal agreement in early 2019. In the indicative votes on 27 March, Hair voted against a referendum on a withdrawal agreement, against a customs union with the EU, and against single market membership.

In January 2019, she was appointed as a parliamentary private secretary (PPS) in the Ministry of Justice. In June, Hair became the PPS to David Mundell, Secretary of State for Scotland. In October, she voted for Prime Minister Boris Johnson's Brexit withdrawal agreement. In the December general election, Hair lost her seat to the SNP candidate, Dave Doogan.

In September 2020, she became an advisor to the new leader of the Scottish Conservatives, Douglas Ross.

References

External links

1989 births
Living people
UK MPs 2017–2019
Scottish Conservative Party MPs
Female members of the Parliament of the United Kingdom for Scottish constituencies
Alumni of the University of Aberdeen
People from Brechin
21st-century Scottish women politicians
21st-century Scottish politicians